The West Bomberai languages are a family of Papuan languages spoken on the Bomberai Peninsula of western New Guinea and in East Timor and neighboring islands of Indonesia.

Languages
Two of the languages of the mainland, Baham and Iha, are closely related to each other; the third is distant, forming a third branch of the family along with the Timor–Alor–Pantar languages:
 
 Mbahaam–Iha: Baham (Mbaham), Iha
 Karas
 Timor–Alor–Pantar

Ross (2005) classified Timor–Alor–Pantar with the mainland West Bomberai languages, although this connection is not universally accepted. Usher found that the Timor–Alor–Pantar languages resides within the West Bomberai languages, and is not just their closest relative.  This suggests that Timor–Alor–Pantar may have been the result of a relatively recent migration from New Guinea, perhaps arriving in the Timor area shortly before the Austronesian languages did.

Classification
Ross (2005) classifies Timor–Alor–Pantar with the West Bomberai languages, the two groups forming a branch within West Trans–New Guinea. Based on a careful examination of new lexical data, Holton & Robinson (2014) find little evidence to support a connection between TAP and TNG. However, Holton & Robinson (2017) concede that a relationship with Trans-New Guinea and West Bomberai in particular is the most likely hypothesis, though they prefer to leave it unclassified for now.
Usher (2020) finds that the two mainland branches of the family are no closer to each other than they are to the Timor–Alor–Pantar languages, and has begun to reconstruct the West Bomberai protolanguage.

Phonemes
Usher (2020) reconstructs the consonant and vowel inventories as:

Prenasalized plosives do not occur initially, having merged with the voiceless plosives.

The vowels are *i *u *e *o *a *ɒ and the diphthong *ai.

Pronouns
Usher (2020) reconstructs the free pronouns as:

{| 
! !!sg!!pl
|-
!1excl
|rowspan=2|*[a/o]n||*in
|-
!1incl
| *pi (?)
|-
!2
|*k[a/o]||*ki
|}

Cognates
Protoforms of the 40 most-stable items in the Swadesh list include the following.

{| class="wikitable sortable"
! Proto–West Bomberai !! gloss
|-
| *am[i/u]n || louse 
|- 
| *kira || water 
|- 
| *kʷali || ear 
|- 
| *k[i/u]m[i/u] || die 
|- 
| *[a/o]n || I 
|- 
| *kina || eye 
|- 
| *tana || hand/arm
|- 
| *nai || name 
|- 
| *war || stone 
|- 
| *ami || breast 
|- 
| *k[a/o] || you 
|- 
| *[ja]ŋgal || path 
|- 
| ? || tongue (*maŋg[a] voice/speech)
|-
| *aŋgin || body/skin
|-
| *kaja || rain
|-
| *waik || blood
|-
| *ukʷan[i] || one
|-
| *ma || come
|-
| *tVmber || mountain
|-
| *ni- || we
|-
| *na[wa] || eat/drink
|-
| *kena[t] || see
|-
| *kʷel[e] || skin/bark
|-
| *jambar || dog
|}

Lexical comparison
The following basic vocabulary words are from Voorhoeve (1975), as cited in the Trans-New Guinea database:

{| class="wikitable sortable"
! gloss !! Baham !! Iha
|-
! head
| kendo-wame || kanda
|-
! hair
| tawe || kandaːtən
|-
! eye
| ki-ep || kendep
|-
! tooth
| sin-tap || mihin-tap
|-
! leg
| kueit || kowk
|-
! louse
| min || mən
|-
! dog
| yambar || mbiar
|-
! pig
| kundur || ndur
|-
! bird
| paru-baru || je
|-
! egg
| un || wund
|-
! blood
| wiek || wek
|-
! bone
| ntoxar || togar
|-
! skin
| pak || ŋein
|-
! tree
| ado-kwiria || adoːp
|-
! man
| namia || nemeːr
|-
! sun
| kamini || kimina
|-
! water
| kirya || kra
|-
! fire
| yambur || toom
|-
! stone
| war || war
|-
! name
| nie || ne
|-
! eat
| nowa || nəw-
|-
! one
| ogono || kwo
|-
! two
| -rik || (he)rik
|}

The following lexical data comparing West Bomberai with other languages of the Bomberai Peninsula and Geelvink Bay is from the Trans-New Guinea database and Usher (2020), unless noted otherwise.

References

External links 
 Timothy Usher, New Guinea World, Proto–West Bomberai

 
Languages of Indonesia